Epipyrops pallidipuncta is a moth in the family Epipyropidae. It was described by George Hampson in 1896. It is found in Sri Lanka.

References

Moths described in 1896
Epipyropidae